Phryneta asmarensis is a species of beetle in the family Cerambycidae. It was described by Stephan von Breuning in 1969. It is known from Eritrea.

References

Endemic fauna of Eritrea
Phrynetini
Beetles described in 1969